The Leonia Public Schools is a comprehensive community public school district that serves students in pre-kindergarten through twelfth grade from Leonia, in Bergen County, New Jersey, United States.

As of the 2018–19 school year, the district, comprising three schools, had an enrollment of 1,952 students and 170.6 classroom teachers (on an FTE basis), for a student–teacher ratio of 11.4:1.

The district is classified by the New Jersey Department of Education as being in District Factor Group "GH", the third-highest of eight groupings. District Factor Groups organize districts statewide to allow comparison by common socioeconomic characteristics of the local districts. From lowest socioeconomic status to highest, the categories are A, B, CD, DE, FG, GH, I and J.

Students from Edgewater attend the district's schools for grades 7-12 as part of a sending/receiving relationship with the Edgewater Public Schools.

In 2005, Leonia Middle School finished the construction of its new addition. That marked the completion of the expansion of the Leonia Public Schools, along with the completion of the high school's math and science wing and Anna C. Scott Elementary School's addition and renovation, completed in 2002 and 2001, respectively.

Schools 
Schools in the district (with 2018–19 enrollment data from the National Center for Education Statistics) are:
Anna C. Scott Elementary School with 663 students in grades PreK-5
Maria Barcelo Martinez, Principal
Leonia Middle School with 533 students in grades 6-8
David Saco, Principal
Leonia High School with 740 students in grades 9-12
Charles Kalender, Principal

Administration 
Core members of the district's administration are:
Edward Bertolini, Superintendent
Rashon Hasan, Business Administrator / Board Secretary

Board of education
The district's board of education, with nine members, sets policy and oversees the fiscal and educational operation of the district through its administration. As a Type II school district, the board's trustees are elected directly by voters to serve three-year terms of office on a staggered basis, with three seats up for election each year held (since 2012) as part of the November general election. A tenth representative is appointed to represent Edgewater.

References

External links 
Leonia Public Schools

School Data for the Leonia Public Schools, National Center for Education Statistics

Leonia, New Jersey
New Jersey District Factor Group GH
School districts in Bergen County, New Jersey